Christian Chartier (born December 29, 1980) is a Canadian ice hockey defenceman who last played for Augsburger Panther in the Deutsche Eishockey Liga (DEL).

Playing career

Junior
Chartier played junior hockey in the Western Hockey League (WHL) for the Saskatoon Blades and Prince George Cougars.  Chartier was drafted 199th overall in the 1999 National Hockey League (NHL) Entry Draft by the Edmonton Oilers.    During his final season in the WHL (2000-01), Chartier was awarded the Bill Hunter Trophy as the WHL's Top Defenceman.  While playing in Prince George, Chartier spent much of his time paired with Dan Hamhuis of the Vancouver Canucks.  After the 2000-01 season, Chartier and Hamhuis were both named to the WHL's First All-Star Team.

Professional
He spent three seasons with the St. John's Maple Leafs in the American Hockey League between 2001 and 2004.  He then spent two seasons in the ECHL with the Las Vegas Wranglers with short spell in the AHL for the Manitoba Moose and the Iowa Stars in between.

In 2006, he moved to the GET-ligaen in Norway to play for Vålerenga Ishockey.  He moved to play with the Augsburger Panther of the DEL starting in 2007. Chartier productively spent the next three seasons on the Panthers blueline. After scoring 33 points in the 2009-10 season, he left to sign a one-year contract with ERC Ingolstadt on May 3, 2010. However in his first season with Ingolstadt, Chartier struggled to recapture his offensive presence and recorded only 13 points in 52 games.

In an attempt to regain form Chartier returned to Augsburger on a one-year deal on April 1, 2011.

Awards and honours

Career statistics

Awards and honours

References

External links
 

1980 births
Augsburger Panther players
Canadian ice hockey defencemen
Edmonton Oilers draft picks
ERC Ingolstadt players
Franco-Manitoban people
Ice hockey people from Manitoba
Iowa Stars players
Las Vegas Wranglers players
Living people
Manitoba Moose players
People from Westman Region, Manitoba
Prince George Cougars players
Saskatoon Blades players
St. John's Maple Leafs players
Vålerenga Ishockey players
Canadian expatriate ice hockey players in Norway
Canadian expatriate ice hockey players in Germany